Alvediston Manor, Alvediston, Wiltshire, England is an 18th-century house. From 1968 until his death in 1977, it was the home of the former prime minister Anthony Eden. The manor is a Grade II listed building.

History and description
The manor house at Alvediston dates from the mid-18th century. Nikolaus Pevsner, in his Buildings of England, notes that the house is "of brick, in a stone county". 
It is of two storeys and is five bays wide and stands in the centre of the village. In 1968, the house was bought by Anthony Eden, using funds from the sale of his memoirs. His wife, Clarissa
designed the garden and Eden kept a small herd of Hereford cattle at the farm he purchased at the same time. In 1975, his last volume of memoirs, Another World, was written at Alvediston. Eden died at the house on 14 January 1977 and is buried in the village churchyard.

Alvediston is a Grade II Listed building, with the garages, and the garden walls, which Pevsner noted were "nicely curved", and the gates and gate piers having separate Grade II listings.

Footnotes

References

Sources
  
 
  

Houses completed in the 18th century
Grade II listed houses
Grade II listed buildings in Wiltshire
Prime ministerial homes in the United Kingdom
Anthony Eden